Allium oschaninii, the French gray shallot, griselle or true shallot, is a perennial plant of the onion genus Allium. It forms underground bulbs much like the (French red) shallots, covered by a layer of pale brown-grey skin (hence the common name).

It is native to Northeastern Iran and Central Asia. It is widely planted in parts of southern France for culinary use.

References 

Allium
Root vegetables
Perennial vegetables